Farida Parveen (born 31 December 1954) is a Bangladeshi folk singer. Referred to as "the Queen of Lalon song," she received Ekushey Padak in 1987 and Bangladesh National Film Award for Best Female Playback Singer for the film Andho Prem (1993) in 1993.

Early life
Parveen was born in Natore and was brought up in Kushtia. Her father worked in the health service. As a child she used to play a harmonium. In 1968, she was enlisted with Rajshahi Betar as a Nazrul singer. She graduated from Kushtia Government College under Rajshahi University.

Parveen first took lesson from Komal Chakrabarti. Later on, she received lessons in classical music from Ustaad Ibrahim Khan, Ustad Rabindranath Ray, Ustad Osman Goni and Ustad Motaleb Biswas. She then learnt Nazrul songs from Ustad Mir Muzaffar Ali and Ustad Abdul Qadir. She was introduced to Lalon music by Moksed Ali Shai.

Career
Parveen started her career with Nazrul Sangeet. In 1973, she performed the patriotic song Ei Padma Ei Meghna and the Lalon song Shatyo Bol Shupothey Chol. Her other songs are Tomra Bhulei Gechho Mallikadir Naam, Nindar Kanta Jodi and several Lalon classics.  She sings mostly Lalon songs. In 2014, she performed in a sufi festival organized by Bangladesh embassy and the Centre for Fine Arts in Belgium. In 2015, she performed in New Delhi at an program organized by Bangladesh High commission on Pohela Boishakh.

Works

Songs
 "Ei Padma Ei Meghna"
 "Barir Kache Arshi Nogor"
 "Shatyo Bol Shupothey Chol"
 "Tomra Bhulei Gechho Mallikader Naam"
 "Nindar Kata Jodi"
 "Porga Namaz Jene Shune"

Albums
 Khachar Vitor Ochin Pakhi
 Kishoree Bou
 Milon Hobe Koto Dine
 Nindar Kata
 Pap Punner Kotha
 Shomoi Gele Shodhan Hobena
 Tomra Vule Gacho

Awards
 Feroza Begum Memorial Gold Medal (2019)
 Fukuoka Asian Culture Prize (2008)
 Bangladesh National Film Award for Best Female Playback Singer (1993)
 Ekushey Padak (1987)
 Anannya Top Ten Awards (2008)

References

1954 births
Living people
People from Natore District
Kushtia Government College Alumni
20th-century Bangladeshi women singers
20th-century Bangladeshi singers
Recipients of the Ekushey Padak
Honorary Fellows of Bangla Academy
Best Female Playback Singer National Film Award (Bangladesh) winners